Robert Morton Fass (June 29, 1933 – April 24, 2021) was an American radio personality and pioneer of free-form radio, who broadcast in the New York region for over 50 years. Fass's program, Radio Unnameable, aired in some form from 1963 until his death primarily on WBAI, a radio station operating out of New York City.

Early years
Robert Morton Fass was born June 29, 1933 and grew up in Brooklyn, New York. He graduated from Syracuse University in 1955. When he went into the army in 1956, he started a theater at Fort Bragg, North Carolina. Fass received a scholarship to study acting with Sandy Meisner and Sydney Pollack at the Neighborhood Playhouse and was also a member of Stella Adler's workshop.

He appeared on stage in Brendan Behan's The Hostage at Circle in the Square, The Execution of Private Slovik with Dustin Hoffman, and The Man with the Golden Arm at the Cherry Lane, among other New York productions. In 1960, he took over the role of the warden in the legendary off-Broadway production of Threepenny Opera with Lotte Lenya. Over the next two years, he played a variety of roles in the show, also acting as assistant stage manager.

In 1963, he began working at WBAI, operated by the Pacifica Foundation. Novelist and poet Richard Elman, a friend of Fass's from high school, who was producing programs for the station's Drama & Literature Department,  helped Fass get a job as an announcer. He then was given the midnight to dawn time block to use as he wished.

Radio Unnameable
The Unnamable by Samuel Beckett, which Fass was reading at the time, gave the show its title. His signature greeting, "Good morning, cabal," came from a listener. "I wanted a sign-on line, like William B. Williams "Good morning, world," says Fass.

Someone sent in a postcard suggesting, "Good morning, cabal." I looked it up in the dictionary and discovered that the word, cabal, comes from "horse." Originally, people met on horseback at night with their identities concealed-even from each other—to plot or plan something subversive. And I thought, that's it: "Good morning, cabal."

Show content
The show was described as a free-form show often with random phone calls and political discussion."

Nowhere else, Jay Sand writes, could you hear a DJ

playing two records at the same time or backwards, or the same song over and over and over again, simply because he liked its message.  Nowhere else in the early 60s could you hear callers and hosts alike criticize LBJ [President Lyndon B. Johnson] for escalating the War in Vietnam, encourage men to burn their draft cards, or talk in glowing terms about their drug experiences. Radio Unnameable was a counterculture radio show before anyone ever applied the term to America's drop-out youth. Bob Fass was a hippie before there were hippies. 

Fass collaborated with Gerd Stern and Michael Callahan's media collective, USCO, which had produced sound fields for Timothy Leary's Fillmore East shows, then dove in and began creating  mixes on the air.

In the mid 1970s, Fass asked the station's Chief Engineer, Mike Edl, if there was any way to rig up a contraption that would allow Fass to put as many as ten phone calls on the air at the same time. The system Edl built became a centerpiece of Fass's show, allowing more of his listeners to connect with him, and with each other.

Response to the show
Neil Fabricant, Legislative Director of New York's ACLU during the 1960s, has said that Fass was "a midwife at the birth of the counterculture."  Ralph Engleman, in his book, Public Radio & TV in America: A Political History, cites Fass as "the first to develop the full potential of free-form radio and make it a major vehicle of the counterculture." and Wavy Gravy refers to him as "the father of freeform radio."

He also plays a major role in Marc Fisher's book, Something In The Air, which covers radio's impact in the post-TV years. The Washington Post columnist describes how the "I'm mad as hell and I'm not going to take it any more!" scene in the film, Network, grew out of an actual incident when WOR's Jean Shepherd exhorted his listeners to throw open their windows, stick out their heads, and shout, "Excelsior!", then he goes on to write "Radio Unnameable would inspire a monsoon of musical, sexual, pharmacological, political, and social change"

Shepherd took the unseen audience and let them see each other, but it's Bob Fass who took that to the next level, giving it social and political meaning. Fass really opened the door and summoned the audience into the action. He used the mass media to amass a very real movement.

"Midwife to a Movement"

Human Fly-In
Some believe it began one night on-air in 1967, when Fass invited "the Cabal" to join him for the Fly-In, a get together at JFK airport where he and his friends could meet and party with Radio Unnameable listeners and their friends, while aircraft took off and landed in the background. ("My vision was like the Hawaiians who greet you when you get off the plane with leis, a kiss, and song," Fass says.)

About a month later, on February 11, 1967, 3000 people showed up at midnight "on the coldest day of the year", to play guitar and hang out at the International Arrivals Terminal. Fass told author Jay Sand, "that was the first inkling I had that there were so many people and that they wanted so much to get together." "Something about this electronic thing - this radio station - makes it possible to listen to other people like themselves and they get the idea they aren't alone."

Sweep In
Excited by the response to the Fly In, Fass and his friends looked for another opportunity to gather. Emmett Grogan of the Diggers suggested the next get together should put all that energy towards a good purpose, "like cleaning up the junk on the Lower East Side." They announced plans for a Sweep In which would be held on April 8, 1967 and invited the audience to join them in cleaning up Krassner's garbage-strewn block; 7th Street between Avenue D and Avenue C. Word of the upcoming spring-cleaning eventually reached New York's Sanitation Department. Apparently embarrassed by the idea of dirty hippies doing their work for them, city trucks were dispatched in the wee hours to clean the block, from top to bottom, a hitherto unprecedented occurrence. That didn't dampen the enthusiasm of Fass's listeners. When they arrived armed with brooms, mops, sponges and cleaning solutions and discovered the original mission had been accomplished; they simply moved down to 3rd Street and started scrubbing there. The New York Times reported a sizeable group of participants were kids who came in from Westchester County and Long Island.

Yippies
It wasn't long before the movement nurtured in NYC went national. Abbie Hoffman became a household name in August 1967, after he led an anti-capitalist demonstration at the New York Stock Exchange, showering the traders with dollar bills. Radio Unnameable became the communications hub of the Yippies!, the Youth International Party, started by Hoffman, Jerry Rubin, Fass, Krassner, and a few others, to bring flower children, acidheads and old lefties together into one group that could change the course of American society.

The Yippies! got worldwide attention that October when they applied for permission to levitate the Pentagon during a massive anti-Vietnam War demonstration that attracted 50,000 to Washington D.C. Fass can be heard on tapes of the event (along with Ed Sanders of the rock group The Fugs, and Mountain Girl) chanting, "out demons, out!" as they attempt to exorcize the evil spirits at the War Department.

Yip In at Grand Central
Not every one appreciated the Yippies' sense of humor and it proved hard to keep things light in 1968. Fass and his friends spent months on the air plotting a march on Chicago to coincide with the Democratic National Convention. They dubbed it the "Festival of Life", in contrast to the "Festival of Death," they felt the political power brokers were advancing in Vietnam.  As a kind of a practice run for the big event, the Yippies decided to hold a Yip In at Grand Central Terminal in New York in March 1968.

It began as a happy go lucky party; a reunion of people who'd met at the Fly In and the Easter Be-In in Central Park the previous year. WBAI had reporters on the scene and Fass was broadcasting calls from Paul Krassner and others at Grand Central, describing the good vibes and great turn out. Then suddenly, things turned  violent. Several hippies from the commune, Up Against the Wall Motherfuckers, decided it would be a symbolic gesture to rip the hands off the clock at the train station in "a rape of time." A couple others set off firecrackers and the NYPD began cracking heads and smashing cameras. As the panicked crowd streamed for the exits, over 200 cops cornered them, throwing individuals like Village Voice reporter, Don McNeill, through glass doors, and dragging others out and arresting them.

Radio Unnameable provided a link between people inside the terminal and the audience listening at home. He broadcast eyewitness accounts from the scene and spoke to Abbie Hoffman, who was getting his wounds patched up at Bellevue Hospital. Washington Post reporter, Nicholas Von Hoffman, came directly from Grand Central to join Fass on the air.

It was a brutal initiation for the Yippies but it was also the moment that solidified Fass's place in the city. He was providing up to the second, unfiltered news that citizens wary of mainstream press coverage could trust. As Sand points out in the Radio Waves Unnameable— "Bob Fass did not just report the news, he helped mold the events of the time."

Columbia occupation
The next month, when Columbia students occupied school buildings to protest the University's stance on the war and a plan to evict Harlem residents in order to build a gymnasium, WBAI, with Fass's show in the lead,  "acted as a nerve center for the demonstrators."  After the assassinations of Martin Luther King Jr. and Robert F. Kennedy, Fass provided in depth, ongoing alternative coverage, giving listeners and independent investigators a chance to grieve, discuss theories, express opinions and trade information considered too controversial for the major media.

1968 DNC
In the weeks leading up to the 1968 Democratic National Convention, callers and guests on Radio Unnameable debated the wisdom of marching directly into the path of Mayor Richard J. Daley's troops. Fass cautioned listeners "to know what they were getting into should they choose to go. They don't mess around in Chicago." Vin Scelsa, later a major NYC radio broadcaster in his own right, then a WBAI listener, told Jay Sand, "We all should have been indicted as co-conspirators, not just the Chicago Seven. We were all in on it. That whole thing was planned on Bob's show."

Fass rarely left his command center in WBAI's Master Control but at the very last minute, he flew to Chicago and recorded everything he saw and heard. After reporting a noise that sounded  like "an M1 cracking against someone's head," Fass noticed that some of the national guardsmen "look very frightened. They are putting on their gas masks. They aren't very experienced with them."

The ensuing attack, roughing up hippies and network news reporters, was broadcast live on television. When the dust settled, several of Fass's comrades were arrested for conspiracy and inciting to riot.

Fass escaped indictment and returned to WBAI, where over the next decade, his show became a kind of an alternative Town Hall; Abbie Hoffman called virtually every night with an update from the show trial of the Chicago Seven, which lasted for months.

Rubin Carter
Over the long years of Rubin Carter's incarceration for a murder he did not commit, attorney Flo Kennedy called Radio Unnameable regularly "to keep the case in the consciousness of at least listeners to late night radio," says Fass. He remembers visiting Woodstock during the early 1970s and telling Bob Dylan "Carter was being railroaded for being "an uppity nigger." Several years later, Dylan produced his epic song telling the story of the unjust conviction (Hurricane) and formed his Rolling Thunder Revue specifically to raise funds for Carter's defense. Fass calls the subsequent retrial and vindication of Carter "one of the great cooperative efforts where hippies and blacks united to achieve change before Jesse Jackson's Rainbow Coalition."

The 1970s onward
Fass continued to do his show as New York City and WBAI went through radical changes. In the 1970s, the Movement split into factions and new program directors and station managers began to alter the thrust of the programming, apportioning blocks of airtime to feminists, gay rights activists, African-Americans, Hispanic-Americans, Native Americans, and other interest groups. Fass and many others felt this approach was the very antithesis of the personal character of WBAI.

Station takeover and lock-out
In 1977, Fass found himself at the  forefront of a power struggle for the future of the station. He participated in a staff attempt to form a union. Management accused him of "living in the past" and ordered him not to discuss the station's internal business on the air. That was a request he found impossible to adhere to because he felt strongly that listeners paying to support non-commercial radio deserved to know and have a voice in what was being planned. The stand off ended with some staff members seizing control of WBAI's transmitter at the Empire State Building, while others (including Fass) remained barricaded in the studios, broadcasting until the phone lines were cut and the police arrived to haul them away.

New York City's free speech station padlocked the front door and suspended broadcasting for 35 days. Fass was banned for five years, during which he returned to stage acting, did a guest residency at WFMU in New Jersey, and campaigned to return to WBAI.

Reinstatement
Since his reinstatement in 1982, Fass continued in the same vein. Singers like Jeffrey Lewis, Roy Zimmerman, Debby Dalton, Kathy Zimmer and Rav Shmuel, blues guitarists Toby Walker  and Guy Davis, radical environmentalist Keith Lampke and visual artists like Keith Haring, Art Spiegelman and MacArthur Fellow Ben Katchor, are just a few who have joined the roster of Radio Unnameable guests. Fass reassembled the members of The Lovin' Spoonful on the air, emceed the Phil Ochs Memorial, and flew to Houston to celebrate Jerry Jeff Walker's birthday, which he taped and played on the radio.

In the mid-1980s, Fass was nearly homeless. AJ Weberman rented a truck for Fass and a large storage unit to hold his archives, paid in advance for many years.

Fass was last paid for his radio time in 1977. Musicians like Dave Bromberg turn up at tributes to thank Bob "for giving us our careers." Many of his protégées have turned colleagues, like Steve Post, Larry Josephson, and Vin Scelsa, and have spoken of his generosity with his time. Listeners have made donations to his retirement fund. "It's better than BAI paying me that people remember me, I guess," Fass said.

By 2006, Fass's time on WBAI had been reduced to just one night a week. He continued to host in that single weekly overnight time slot. On October 4, 2019, WBAI was illegally seized by a minority faction of Pacifica's board without authorization, and canceled all of WBAI's original programming including Fass's show, replacing it with canned programs from California. This lasted a month before it could be reversed through court action and Radio Unnameable was restored.

Notable guests
Fass remembered his very first guest on the air was Paul Krassner, editor of The Realist, soon followed by Zen poet D.A. Levy. Krassner became a regular, along with Timothy Leary, Wavy Gravy, (aka comedian Hugh Romney), filmmaker Robert Downey, David Amram, comic actor and writer, Marshall Efron, the club performer, Brother Theodore, and Kinky Friedman (years before he began writing mystery stories and took up politics).

Notable guests include investigative reporter Mae Brussell, Abbie Hoffman commenting on the Chicago Seven trial, a planning session for the Central Park Be-In, and the first radio appearance of Phoebe Snow. The show has featured the work, and the first performances of Arlo Guthrie's "Alice's Restaurant" and Jerry Jeff Walker's "Mr. Bojangles."

Allen Ginsberg, Peter Orlovsky, and Gregory Corso, turned up multiple times. Over the course of the years, activist attorney Flo Kennedy kept listeners abreast of the latest injustices in America's court system. Steve Ben Israel and Judith Malina of the Living Theater, actor Rip Torn (and more recently his son, director Tony Torn), Ed Sanders, Tuli Kupferberg, and the rest of The Fugs, all made themselves comfortable on Fass's show. Abbie Hoffman, the former civil rights organizer turned political provocateur appeared regularly during the tumultuous years from 1968-1973.

Musicians
A long list of musicians have appeared on Radio Unnameable, including Townes Van Zandt, David Peel, Richie Havens, Jose Feliciano, Joni Mitchell, The Fugs, Karen Dalton, Patti Smith and Phil Ochs (parodying "Positively 4th Street"; half pretending a comic competition with Bob Dylan, but later telling disapproving callers that it was Dylan's right to play with an electric guitar and a band behind him). The Incredible String Band came over from England with their manager, Joe Boyd, Happy and Artie Traum often stopped by before heading back to Woodstock.

Other performers include Taj Mahal, Paul Siebel, Muddy Waters, Otis Spann, Skip James, Rosalie Sorrels, Tiny Tim, Jake & the Family Jewels, Cat Mother & the All Night Newsboys, Melanie, Penny Arcade, Rambling Jack Elliot, Tom Rapp and Pearls before Swine, Frank Zappa, Jeremy Steig, The Holy Modal Rounders, Sis Cunningham and Sammy Walker.

Bob Dylan
Fass met Dylan before he began his radio career, double dating with Carla Rotolo, one-time stage manager of The Hostage, and her sister, Suze, who was Dylan's girlfriend.
 
We went out to dinner in the Village and played poker at Dylan's apartment over The Music Inn on W. 4th Street," Fass remembers. "When I started the show, he listened and occasionally I could squeeze a suggestion out of him. He turned me on to Lightnin' Hopkins."

Dylan's first appearance on radio was on Radio Unnameable doing comic improvs with Suze Rotolo and John Herald in 1963. Listeners also got a preview of his forthcoming album, Freewheelin'. In 1966, in the midst of recording Blonde on Blonde, he returned to Radio Unnameable, taking calls from listeners. When Dylan's crusading anthem, Hurricane, came out in the mid 1970s, Fass played it all night for five nights in a row and in 1986, when Dylan turned 45; he organized a 45-hour marathon of his music for WBAI.

Fass explained the connection to NPR reporter (and former WBAI news reporter) Jon Kalish, this way:

Bob Dylan is the leading bard of our age. I feel grateful to have been alive while he's been writing. In a way, it's like having known Shakespeare.

Style
Fass had never been a brilliant monologist like Jean Shepherd who preceded him on WOR in the late 50s, nor a star interviewer. His style was to make a few gentle stabs at drawing his guest out, and then he was content to go with the flow. His singular talent, as Sand notes in The Radio Waves Unnameable, was for orchestrating the great mix;  "For Fass, beauty exists in the way events intertwine... the art came in the complete presentation... and for better or worse, the divergent strands of life which Fass presented would have fused to form a lucid whole by the time he said, 'BYE BYE'."

Unlike almost any other radio or television personality, silence never scared Fass. Seconds passed as he seemingly pondered the thoughts of his guests, leaving them or the listener a space to fill in the blanks. In addition to being a congenial master of ceremonies, Fass was a good listener.

He was always ready to lend an ear and share the air with absolutely anyone who felt they had something to say. This largesse often led to endless, boring mouthing off, but equally often led to dynamic, intimate flurries of insight, energy, humor and understanding.

Remembering the appearance of the Brooklyn Black Panthers on Radio Unnameable back in the day, Fass said, "I kind of like it when people come up a little hostile and suspicious and I and the audience warm them up and win them over by the end of the show."

Community organizers knew they could always count on Fass for airtime to spread word of current crises or upcoming events. He was an ongoing outlet for the unsung, unspun, ignored and unknown.

Issues
Fass was a fierce and consistent critic of, as he called it, "Bush's war for oil",  and continued to speak out against capital punishment, often putting prisoners who call from jail on the air. Anti-draft protestors would phone from the courthouse after being arrested to ask Bob's audience for help in raising bail. A woman called to say her landlord had set fire to her building, and she had no other place to go—were there any carpenters listening who might help her rebuild?

He returned to the issue of homelessness in New York numerous times, raising awareness about the dangerous city shelters, reporting on the gentrification of many of the city's neighborhoods which traditionally had offered affordable housing, and slamming the city's " assault on rent control." In the mid-1980s, Fass made remote recordings at the tent city the homeless had erected in Tompkins Square Park on the Lower East Side. He went on to work with the Living Theater and members of that community to produce a piece of theater based on their experiences (which included both professional actors and homeless people), called The Hands of God.

At least one suicidal listener called in to receive on-air counseling. In 1971, a man (later identified as Michael Valenti) called in at about 2:45 AM and announced that he had taken three kinds of sleeping pills and was going to commit suicide. Fass spent about an hour and a half talking to the caller live on the air, as other WBAI workers contacted the police and the phone company attempted to trace the call. The police finally found the caller lying unconscious on his bedroom floor. His telephone was off the hook, the radio tuned to WBAI. He was taken to the hospital in critical condition but survived. Fass says the man contacted him later and thanked him for being there. The press tried to turn Fass into a hero, but he demurred. When a Daily News reporter arrived at his home, wanting to take his picture, Fass passed him a photo of his colleague, Larry Josephson, through a crack in the door. Josephson made the front page, identified incorrectly as "Bob Fass, WBAI's heroic DJ". Fass later commented that he thought "Larry would enjoy having his picture in the paper".

Influence
In his book about life at WBAI, Playing in the FM Band, Steve Post describes Fass as "a gigantic man with receding blond hair and thick black-rimmed glasses, with hands so huge they appeared to dominate his enormous frame. His voice, soft and gentle, which I heard coming from the office monitors seemed somehow detached from his body." Post, who began as WBAI's bookkeeper before hosting a program of his own, The Outside, describes how Fass took him under "his ample wing" and allowed him to watch him at work, teaching him what he knew, demystifying the whole process.

Julius Lester, a former SNCC photographer, recalls being so in awe of Fass that for the first year he did his own program at WBAI people constantly mistook him for Bob.

Larry Josephson, who would become WBAI'S morning man and eventually station manager, remembers the first time Bob motioned him into Master Control: "It was like Dorothy entering Oz."

Fass encouraged dozens of wanna-be DJs. His continuing impact is clear, according to Marc Fisher, author of Something in the Air (Random House, 2007), who says Fass has inspired countless other personalities like Sirius shock jock Howard Stern (who listened to Bob a lot as a kid), Tom Leykis in L.A., and Vin Scelsa, to ride the radio waves.

"I like the idea of sharing, from each according to their ability, to each according to their need," said Fass. "I want to connect people in one city with people in another. I think information can cure almost anything."

"Like many others, Bob wanted to change the world. Unlike many others, he had access to the airwaves and therefore a very real opportunity to do so," says Sand.

Legacy
In 2005, attorney Neil Fabricant, President Emeritus of the School of Social Policy at GWU, organized a rent party for Fass. "The right wing has spent billions of dollars to revise the history of an era and to distort the collective memory," Fabricant says. He suggests that restoring and properly archiving the 45 years of Bob Fass's program "would be a giant first step in reclaiming that history."

A documentary film about Fass and the show, also named Radio Unnameable, aired on the World Channel series America ReFramed on September 17, 2013.

80 hours of Radio Unnameable have been acquired and are currently available at the Museum of Television and Radio in New York.

Good Evening Cabal, a weekly show on a Florida-based community FM station, is named as a tribute to Bob Fass by its host, Curt Werner, who as a Brooklyn teenager listened to Fass in the 1960s on WBAI. The program, which features music from the 1960s and 1970s, and live interviews with artists and writers from that era, has been on the air for four years on WSLR 96.5 LPFM in Sarasota, Florida. Fass himself appeared as a guest on the show in 2007.

Quotes about Fass
When speaking today to those who listened to Bob Fass regularly throughout the '60s, one can sense an almost spiritual reverence that they still hold for Radio Unnameable. Before the cultural explosion of the mid-1960s- before listening to Radio Unnameable became a ritual shared by the city's counterculture community – those who discovered Fass felt as if they had untapped a passageway into a magical world, and many instantaneously became religious Radio Unnameable devotees.

Broadcast samples
The internet archive has available a sound recording (in various formats) of a program "featuring live interviews with Jerry Rubin, Abbie Hoffman, and Phil Ochs": Bob Fass in Chicago - August 27, 1968

Death
Fass's death was announced via the WBAI Twitter account: "Bob Fass, Legendary Icon, the Father of Free Form Radio who had a program and home @WBAI since 1963, passed away peacefully April 24, 2021. He was 87 years old. We love you Bob. Rest in Peace." Fass's widow stated that Fass, after recently recovering from COVID-19, died of longstanding congestive heart failure.

WBAI has run reruns of Radio Unnameable segments in Fass's former time slot since his death.

See also
 Timeline of 1960s counterculture
 WBAI
 Yippies

Sources
 Playing in the FM Band: A personal account of free radio – Steve Post – Viking Press, 1974, 
 "A Radio Station with Real Hair, Sweat, and Body Odor" – The New York Times, Susan Braudy; Sep 17, 1972; Sunday Magazine
 "Insurgent Staff Members Take Over WBAI In Coup" – The New York Times, Robert D. McFadden; Feb 12, 1977
 Sand, Jay. "THE RADIO WAVES UNNAMEABLE:." 24 Jan. 1996. 28 Aug. 2006 <.
 Breslin, Jimmy. "BETWEEN EVANGELIST & a ROCK SHOW, JUSTICE." NY Daily News 29 Oct. 1985.
 Engleman, Ralph. Public Radio & TV in America: a Political History. Thousand Oaks, CA: Sage Publications, 1996. p. 57
 Fisher, Marc. Something in the Air. New York, NY: Random House, 2007. pp124–157 
 Platzer, David "Some Radio Unnameable Nights with Bob Dylan", The London Magazine December 2004/January 2005
"On Air, a Broadcaster and a Killer Shared a Platform" New York Times, Feb 24, 2008

References

Notes

External links
Bob Fass at WBAI
Radio Unnameable - documentary film website

1933 births
2021 deaths
American anti-war activists
Pacifica Foundation people
Military personnel from New York City
American radio DJs
Freeform (radio format)
Yippies
Free speech activists
People from Brooklyn